USS Roberts may refer to more than one United States Navy ship:

 , a destroyer escort in service from 1944 to 1964
 USS John Q. Roberts (DE-235), a destroyer escort converted during construction into the high-speed transport 
 , a high-speed transport in commission from 1944 to 1946
 , the name of various ships

United States Navy ship names